= Mircea Gheorghe Drăghici =

Romanian politician

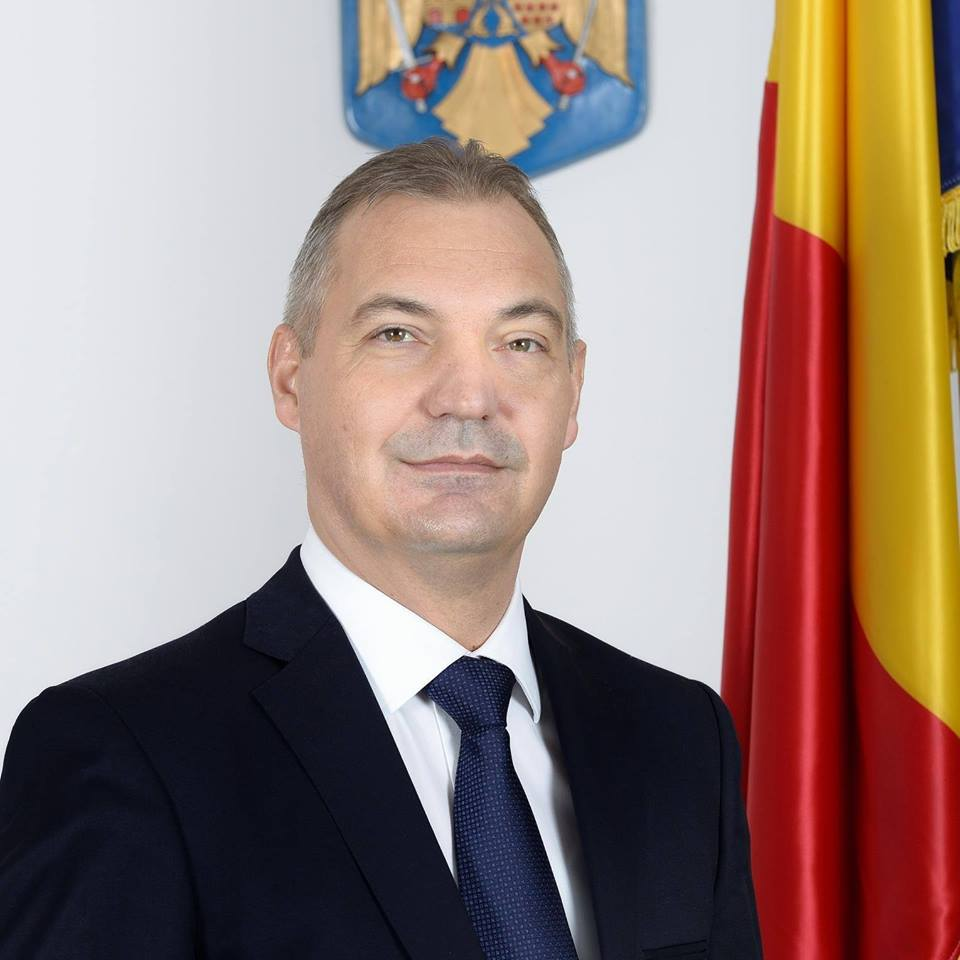
- In office 2016–2020
- Deputy: No. 2 College, Curtea de Argeș

Personal details
- Party: Social Democratic Party

Mircea Gheorghe Drăghici, treasurer of the Social Democratic Party (Romania) has been Deputy in the Parliament of Romania in the 2008-2012, and 2012-2016 mandates; he continues to hold this position today, having been re-elected for the 2016-2020 mandate on behalf of PSD Argeș.

The Romanian politician is also a founding member of the Sports Automobile Romanian Federation.

== Education ==
Born in Târgoviște, Mircea Gheorghe Drăghici graduated from the Polytechnic Institute in Bucharest in 1989, at the Sub-Engineering Faculty, the Automobile section.

His studies continue at the University of Pitești, where the future politician obtains an engineering qualification at the Engineering Faculty, in the Road Vehicles Section.

Until 2015, the current PSD Deputy will continue his professional education with post-academic studies:

- 2015 - Internal Affairs National College, graduate of the ”Internal Affairs Strategic Management” Post-Academic Course.
- 2013 - Carol I National Defence University, National College of Defence, graduate of the Continuous Professional Training and Development Post-Academic Program in Security and National Defense - “Security and Good Governance”. Field: Military Sciences, Information and Public Order.
- 2008 - „Ovidiu Șincai” School for Post-University Academic Studies, Bucharest - Master's degree in “Political Management”
- 2004-2005 - National Institute of Administration, Public Administration specialization - Post-Academic Specialized Training Courses.
- Qualification: High Office Clerk (Chief of Promotion)
- 2001-2002 - A.S.E. Bucharest, C.I.E.D.D., Public Administration Management specialization - Post-Academic course.

== Areas of interest ==
- Education
- Support for the young
- Transportation
- Auto Industry
- Health
- Environment Protection
